KRT25 is a keratin gene.